Berlin Center is an unincorporated community in central Berlin Township, Mahoning County, in the U.S. state of Ohio. It lies east of the Berlin Lake reservoir.

History
A post office called Berlin Centre was established in 1833, and the name was changed to Berlin Center in 1893. The community takes its name from Berlin Township. In 1907, Berlin Center had about 60 inhabitants.

Notable residents 
 Ming of Harlem – tiger who resided at Noah's Lost Ark Animal Sanctuary after being found in a Harlem apartment

References

Unincorporated communities in Mahoning County, Ohio
1833 establishments in Ohio
Populated places established in 1833
Unincorporated communities in Ohio
Western Reserve, Ohio